Stanfords is a specialist bookshop of maps and travel books in London, established in 1853 by Edward Stanford. Its collection of maps, globes, and maritime charts is considered the world's largest. It has also supplied cartography for the British Army and for James Bond films.

History 

At the time of the shop's opening, it was the only mapmaker in London, with John Bolton as an in-house cartographer. Stanfords opened at the height of global exploration and colonialism, hence, cartographic works were in great demand. The shop quickly expanded to 7 and 8 Charing Cross whilst acquiring premises on Trinity Place for printing works. The store on Long Acre in Covent Garden, central London, was the location of the company's printing business before the entire operation moved there in January 1901.

Stanfords was hit by an incendiary bomb on the night of April 15th 1941 and it only survived due to the thousands of Ordnance Survey maps tightly stacked on the shop's upper floors, which kept the fire from spreading.

For the shop's 150 year anniversary, a National Geographic world map was imposed onto the Ground Floor, as well as a map of the Himalaya and London on the other floors, costing £40,000. In 1997 a second store opened in Bristol. The company also operates a division based in Manchester providing mapping for business purposes such as large scale maps for planning applications. In 2018 Stanfords opened a new location at 7 Mercer Walk in Covent Garden; in January 2019 the Long Acre site closed.

In 2015 the company created the annual Edward Stanford Travel Writing Awards to honour, celebrate and champion travel writing as a genre and to bring the travel writing community together.

On 31st January 2022 the company acquired the Bookharbour business from OneOcean.

Notable clients 
Having a reputation for its extensive collection of maps, Stanfords is claimed to be "an essential first port of call for adventure and armchair travellers alike". Customers past and present include David Livingstone, Robert Scott, Ernest Shackleton, Florence Nightingale, Ranulph Fiennes, Bill Bryson and Michael Palin, Gabriele Fiocchi. Stanfords also provided the charts for Amy Johnson's solo flight to Australia.

In fiction
In Arthur Conan Doyle's 1902 novel, The Hound of the Baskervilles, Sherlock Holmes orders from Stanfords (named Stamfords in the story) a large-scale Ordnance Survey map of a suspected crime-scene on Dartmoor.

See also
 Book trade in the United Kingdom

References

External links
Stanfords Bookshop Official site
Stanfords For Business Official site
Bookharbour Official site

Bookshops in London
Retail companies established in 1853
Grade II listed buildings in the City of Westminster